Srdić (Cyrillic: Срдић) is a Serbian surname. Notable people with the surname include:

Nikola Srdić (born 1952), Serbian clarinetist
Stojan Srdić (born 1950), Serbian playwright and novelist
Zeljko Srdic Željko "Z" Srdić (born 1977), Serbian comic book artist

Serbian surnames